Forest–Southview Residential Historic District is a national historic district located at Hammond, Lake County, Indiana.   The district encompasses 39 contributing buildings and 1 contributing site in an exclusively residential section of Hammond. It developed between about 1912 and 1949, and includes notable example of Renaissance Revival, Colonial Revival, Tudor Revival, and Bungalow / American Craftsman styles of residential architecture.

It was listed in the National Register of Historic Places in 2010.

References

Historic districts on the National Register of Historic Places in Indiana
Renaissance Revival architecture in Indiana
Colonial Revival architecture in Indiana
Tudor Revival architecture in Indiana
Historic districts in Hammond, Indiana
National Register of Historic Places in Lake County, Indiana